Planning areas, also known as DGP areas or DGP zones, are the main urban planning and census divisions of Singapore delineated by the Urban Redevelopment Authority. There are a total of 55 of these areas, organised into five regions. A Development Guide Plan is then drawn up for each planning area, providing for detailed planning guidelines for every individual plot of land throughout the country.

The planning areas were first introduced in the early 1990s after the release of the 1991 Concept Plan. Since the implementation of these boundaries, other government ministries and departments have also increasingly adopted these boundaries for their administrative purposes. For example, the Statistics Department of Singapore published its 2000 census data based on planning area boundaries for the first time, compared to using census divisions based on electoral boundaries for previous exercises. The Singapore Police Force's (SPF) neighbourhood police centres have jurisdiction boundaries based on planning area boundaries when they were officially gazetted in 1999, as opposed to electoral divisions under the previous neighbourhood Police Post system.

List of planning areas

Planning Areas are further subdivided into subzones for statistical purposes.

* = Place names attested to be of Malay origin and referred to similarly in the Malay language.

See also
 Regions of Singapore
 Administrative divisions of Singapore

References

External links
Planning Areas Boundaries Map A
Planning Areas Boundaries Map B

 
Subdivisions of Singapore